Dirca occidentalis, the western leatherwood, is a deciduous shrub with leaves three to seven centimeters in length.  Yellow flowers emerge prior to leafing.  It grows on moist and shaded slopes.  It is rare and endemic to the San Francisco Bay area of California. Its closest relative, Dirca palustris, lives in the eastern half of North America.

Gallery

References

External links
Dirca occidentalis images at the Arnold Arboretum of Harvard University Plant Image Database
Friedman, William (Ned). "As good as gold (well better actually)". Posts from the Collections, Arnold Arboretum of Harvard University website, 28 March 2020. Accessed 30 April 2020.
Jepson Manual Online Dirca occidentalis A. Gray

Thymelaeoideae
Endemic flora of California
Endemic flora of the San Francisco Bay Area
~